Andrew Solomon (born 1963) is an American writer.

Andrew Solomon may also refer to:

 Andrew Solomon, a character from Shortland Street, a New Zealand soap opera

See also
Solomon Andrews (disambiguation)
Togo (comedian) (Andres Solomon, 1905–1952), Filipino actor and comedian